Hussainabad is one of the neighbourhoods of Malir Town in Karachi, Sindh, Pakistan.

In Hussainabad, the majority of people belong to the Shia sect of Islam, and various majalis (congregations) are organized through the Imambargah Darbaray Hussaini. The main mosque is Hussaini Jama Masjid and Imambargah Darbaray Hussaini Hussainabad Malir Colony Karachi. The population of Malir Town is estimated to be nearly one million.

References

External links 
 Karachi Website 

Neighbourhoods of Karachi